The 2021 Wyoming Cowboys football team represented the University of Wyoming in the 2021 NCAA Division I FBS football season. The Cowboys were led by eighth-year head coach Craig Bohl and played their home games at War Memorial Stadium. They were members of the Mountain Division of the Mountain West Conference.

Previous season
In a season limited due to the ongoing COVID-19 pandemic, the Cowboys finished the 2020 season 2–4 to finish in eighth place in the Mountain West conference.

Offseason

2021 recruiting class
Wyoming signed 19 players to scholarships during their recruiting period.

Preseason

Award watch lists
Listed in the order that they were released

Mountain West media days
Mountain West media days were held on July 21 and 22 at the Cosmopolitan of Las Vegas.

Wyoming was picked to finish second in the Mountain Division in the Mountain West preseason poll.

Media poll

Preseason All–Mountain West

Personnel

Coaching staff

Roster

Source

Schedule

Source

Statistics

Team

Offense

Defense

Key: SOLO: Solo Tackles, AST: Assisted Tackles, TOT: Total Tackles, TFL: Tackles-for-loss, SACK: Quarterback Sacks, INT: Interceptions, BU: Passes Broken Up, QBH: Quarterback Hits, FF: Forced Fumbles, FR: Fumbles Recovered, BLK: Kicks or Punts Blocked, SAF: Safeties

Special teams

Awards and honors

All–conference teams
All-Mountain West teams were announced on November 30, 2021.

Honorable Mentions
Garrett Crall, Sr., DL
Cole Godbout, Jr., DL
Logan Harris, Sr., OL

All–America Teams
Chad Muma, Sr., LB – 2nd Team (WCFF), 3rd Team (AP)

Senior Bowls
Chad Muma, Sr., LB – Senior Bowl

Game summaries

No. 12 (FCS) Montana State

Passing leaders: Sean Chambers (WYO): 15–26, 196 YDS, 1 TD, 1 INT; Matthew McKay (MTST): 19–28, 200 YDS, 2 TD
Rushing leaders: Xazavian Valladay (WYO): 19 CAR, 77 YDS, 1 TD; Isaiah Ifanse (MTST): 16 CAR, 103 YDS
Receiving leaders: Ayden Eberhardt (WYO): 4 REC, 71 YDS; Lance McCutcheon (MTST): 5 REC, 71 YDS, 1 TD

at Northern Illinois

Passing leaders: Sean Chambers (WYO): 13–23, 204 YDS, 2 TD; Rocky Lombardi (NIU): 19–36, 233 YDS, 1 TD, 3 INT
Rushing leaders: Xazavian Valladay (WYO): 21 CAR, 101 YDS, 1 TD; Harrison Waylee (NIU): 26 CAR, 179 YDS, 2 TD
Receiving leaders: Isaiah Neyor (WYO): 4 REC, 87 YDS, 2 TD; Cole Tucker (NIU): 6 REC, 72 YDS

Ball State

Passing leaders: Sean Chambers (WYO): 14–23, 201 YDS, 1 TD; John Paddock (BALL): 13–20, 82 YDS, 1 INT
Rushing leaders: Xazavian Valladay (WYO): 14 CAR, 61 YDS, 1 TD; Carson Steele (BALL): 13 CAR, 76 YDS, 1 TD
Receiving leaders: Isaiah Neyor (WYO): 4 REC, 84 YDS; Jayshon Jackson (BALL): 10 REC, 92 YDS

at UConn

Passing leaders: Sean Chambers (WYO): 15–26, 149 YDS, 1 TD, 2 INT; Tyler Phommachanh (CONN): 19–39, 171 YDS, 1 TD, 1 INT
Rushing leaders: Xazavian Valladay (WYO): 22 CAR, 101 YDS, 1 TD; Nathan Carter (CONN): 10 CAR, 65 YDS, 1 TD
Receiving leaders: Ayden Eberhardt (WYO): 3 REC, 40 YDS; Aaron Turner (CONN): 6 REC, 49 YDS

at Air Force

Passing leaders: Sean Chambers (WYO): 11–28, 143 YDS, 1 TD; Haaziq Daniels (AFA): 7–10, 110 YDS, 1 TD
Rushing leaders: Xazavian Valladay (WYO): 8 CAR, 96 YDS; Brad Roberts (AFA): 33 CAR, 140 YDS, 1 TD
Receiving leaders: Isaiah Neyor (WYO): 3 REC, 55 YDS, 1 TD; Brandon Lewis (AFA): 5 REC, 77 YDS

Fresno State

Passing leaders: Sean Chambers (WYO): 8–23, 111 YDS, 3 INT; Jake Haener (FRES): 15–28, 96 YDS, 2 TD
Rushing leaders: Sean Chambers (WYO): 12 CAR, 51 YDS; Jordan Mims (FRES): 13 CAR, 78 YDS
Receiving leaders: Ayden Eberhardt (WYO): 2 REC, 45 YDS; Zane Pope (FRES): 2 REC, 33 YDS

New Mexico

Passing leaders: Sean Chambers (WYO): 11–23, 96 YDS, 1 INT; Isaiah Chavez (UNM): 10–11, 112 YDS, 1 TD
Rushing leaders: Xazavian Valladay (WYO): 14 CAR, 41 YDS; Isaiah Chavez (UNM): 16 CAR, 49 YDS
Receiving leaders: Isaiah Neyor (WYO): 2 REC, 45 YDS; Kyle Jarvis (UNM): 2 REC, 46 YDS

at San Jose State

Passing leaders: Levi Williams (WYO): 12–22, 129 YDS, 2 TD, 2 INT; Nick Nash (SJSU): 11–22, 150 YDS, 1 TD
Rushing leaders: Xazavian Valladay (WYO): 22 CAR, 172 YDS; Nick Nash (SJSU): 11 CAR, 112 YDS, 1 TD
Receiving leaders: Isaiah Neyor (WYO): 3 REC, 72 YDS, 2 TD; Derrick Deese Jr. (SJSU): 5 REC, 81 YDS

Colorado State

Passing leaders: Levi Williams (WYO): 9–16, 92 YDS, 2 TD; Todd Centeio (CSU): 20–36, 187 YDS, 2 TD, 2 INT
Rushing leaders: Titus Swen (WYO): 21 CAR, 166 YDS; David Bailey (CSU): 19 CAR, 88 YDS
Receiving leaders: Isaiah Neyor (WYO): 3 REC, 45 YDS, 2 TD; Trey McBride (CSU): 9 REC, 98 YDS

at Boise State

Passing leaders: Levi Williams (WYO): 11–18, 155 YDS, 1 TD, 1 INT; Hank Bachmeier (BSU): 23–32, 225 YDS, 1 TD
Rushing leaders: Titus Swen (WYO): 13 CAR, 59 YDS, 1 TD; George Holani (BSU): 20 CAR, 102 YDS
Receiving leaders: Isaiah Neyor (WYO): 6 REC, 126 YDS, 1 TD; Khalil Shakir (BSU): 8 REC, 83 YDS

at Utah State

Passing leaders: Levi Williams (WYO): 12–15, 242 YDS, 2 TD, 1 INT; Logan Bonner (USU): 19–40, 181 YDS, 2 TD
Rushing leaders: Titus Swen (WYO): 15 CAR, 169 YDS, 2 TD; Calvin Tyler Jr. (USU): 18 CAR, 109 YDS
Receiving leaders: Isaiah Neyor (WYO): 4 REC, 125 YDS, 1 TD; Devin Thompkins (USU): 5 REC, 67 YDS, 1 TD

Hawaii

Passing leaders: Levi Williams (WYO): 15–24, 161 YDS, 1 TD; Chevan Cordeiro (HAW): 19–31, 323 YDS, 3 TD, 1 INT
Rushing leaders: Levi Williams (WYO): 9 CAR, 43 YDS; Chevan Cordeiro (HAW): 14 CAR, 86 YDS, 1 TD
Receiving leaders: Isaiah Neyor (WYO): 3 REC, 78 YDS, 1 TD; Calvin Turner Jr. (HAW): 5 REC, 90 YDS

Kent State – Famous Idaho Potato Bowl

Passing leaders: Levi Williams (WYO): 9–11, 127 YDS, 1 TD; Dustin Crum (KENT): 17–27, 316 YDS, 4 TD
Rushing leaders: Levi Williams (WYO): 16 CAR, 200 YDS, 4 TD; Marquez Cooper (KENT): 24 CAR, 125 YDS
Receiving leaders: Isaiah Neyor (WYO): 5 REC, 87 YDS, 1 TD; Dante Cephas (KENT): 4 REC, 116 YDS, 1 TD

Players drafted into the NFL

References

Wyoming
Wyoming Cowboys football seasons
Famous Idaho Potato Bowl champion seasons
Wyoming Cowboys football